Valeriana celtica is a species of plant in the family Caprifoliaceae. It is also known as Alpine valerian and valerian spikenard. It is endemic to the Eastern Alps (V. celtica subsp. norica) and to the Graian and Pennine Alps. Along with Valeriana saxatilis and Valeriana elongata, it forms a clade of dioecious plants. Until the 1930s, it was extensively harvested for export to Asia for use in perfumes. The root has been used as a folk remedy as a nerve tonic.

Gallery

References

External links

celtica
Perfume ingredients
Plants described in 1753
Taxa named by Carl Linnaeus
Dioecious plants